Udolpho may refer to:
The Mysteries of Udolpho
Udolpho Township, Mower County, Minnesota